Jablanica is a mountain range in Southern and Southeastern Europe, stretching north–south direction across the border of Albania and North Macedonia.

Geography 
Both countries have 50% of the mountain, Albania the west and North Macedonia the east. Jablanica Mountain contains many large mountain lakes. Shebenik mountain is located just to the west of Jablanica and give name to the Shebenik-Jabllanice National Park. The closest towns to Jablanica are Librazhd in Albania and Struga in North Macedonia.

The mountain range is one of the few places in the Balkans that hold the Balkan lynx (Lynx lynx martinoi), a subspecies of the Eurasian lynx (Lynx lynx). The total number of this vulnerable species is estimated at below 100 individuals.

See also 

 Central Mountain Range
 Shebenik-Jabllanice National Park 
 Geography of Albania 
 Geography of North Macedonia

References 

 

Two-thousanders of Albania
Two-thousanders of North Macedonia
Albania–North Macedonia border
International mountains of Europe
Geography of Elbasan County
Struga Municipality
Shebenik-Jabllanicë National Park